Attorney General Lee may refer to:

Charles Lee (Attorney General) (1758–1815), Attorney General of the United States
Howard B. Lee (1879–1985), Attorney General of West Virginia
John Lee (Attorney-General) (1733–1793), Attorney General for England and Wales
N. Warner Lee (born 1937), Attorney General of Arizona

See also
General Lee (disambiguation)